The National School of Public Policy (NSPP) is the premier institution for training and capacity building of senior ranking civil servants in Pakistan. All civil servants which are to be considered for promotion to BPS-21 grade by the Central Selection Board have to undertake and pass the trainings at NSPP, whereas all  civil servants from BPS-18 grade to BPS-20 grade undergo promotion trainings and courses at NSPP's constituent units situated in Karachi, Islamabad, Lahore, Quetta and Peshawar respectively. The NSPP campus is located in Lahore.

The NSPP is headed by a Rector, an officer belonging to the Pakistan Administrative Service having previously served as a Federal Secretary. The important position of Rector NSPP is a four-year appointment as laid down in Section 9(2)(a) of NSPP Ordinance 2002. The current Rector NSPP is Azmat Ali Ranjha. The Board of Governors of the NSPP is headed by the President of Pakistan, currently Arif Alvi.

References

Public administration schools in Pakistan
2002 establishments in Pakistan